King's Highway 4, also known as Highway 4, is a provincially maintained highway in the Canadian province of Ontario. Originally much longer than its present  length, more than half of Highway 4 was transferred to the responsibility of local governments in 1998. It travels between Highway 3 in Talbotville Royal, north-west of St. Thomas, and Highway 8 in Clinton, passing through the city of London inbetween.

Highway 4 was first designated in 1920, when a  route between Talbotville Royal and Elginfield was assumed by the Department of Highways. It was extended in the early 1930s both south to Port Stanley as well as north to Flesherton.

Route description

Highway4 starts at an intersection with Highway3 in Talbotville Royal and continues north as a two-lane undivided highway. For most of its length, the highway bisects agricultural land. It travels along a short  concurrency with Highway 401 from the community of Tempo to Wonderland Road. It encounters an interchange with Highway 402 before entering London city limits. As Highway4 enters London, it becomes a Connecting Link, known locally as Wonderland Road. Wonderland Road is a 4-lane arterial thoroughfare serving western London, with several big-box stores, a mall, and residential areas. The route turns east onto Sunningdale Road West, which it for a short distance before turning north along Richmond Street.

Highway4 continues north, passing through Arva, when the surrounding terrain returns to farmland. Highway4 passes through Birr before intersecting with the western terminus of Highway 7 at Elginfield, which is also 1 km east of the Highway 23 junction with Highway7. The highway then curves slightly west, passing through Lucan before continuing north at Clandeboye. Continuing to be flanked by farmland, it then passes through the communities of Huron Park and Exeter. At Exeter, it crosses the former route of Highway 83. From there, it continues north, passing through the communities of Hensall, Ontario and Vanastra, Ontario before terminating at Highway8 in the community of Clinton.

History

Highway4 was originally designated in 1920 when the provincial government assumed the road running from Talbotville Royal (St. Thomas) to the Northern Highway (later Highway7) at Elginfield, via London. The portions within Elgin County were assumed on August4, while the portions south of London were assumed on June24. The portions north of and through London were assumed on August6.
The  route featured a concurrency with the Provincial Highway (later Highway2) between Lambeth and downtown London.

Until the summer of 1925, Ontario highways were named rather than numbered. When route numbering was introduced, the route between St. Thomas and Elginfield became Provincial Highway4.
1927 saw several new sections of road assumed that would become portion of Highway4. On September14, the route was extended to Highway 8 at Clinton. Further north, a new highway was created on June22, 1927, between Highway 9 at Walkerton and Highway 6 at Durham. This latter section was designated as Highway4A.

On March12, 1930, Highway4 was extended to Durham, fully absorbing the route of Highway4A in the process. Two months later, on May11, it was extended south to Bedford Street (now Edith Cavell Boulevard) in Port Stanley. On April11, 1934, the highway was extended east to the intersection of Highway 10 in Flesherton. Highway4 reached its maximum length of  when it was extended from Flesherton to Highway 24 in Singhampton in the mid-1970s.

Downloads 

As part of a series of budget cuts initiated by premier Mike Harris under his Common Sense Revolution platform in 1995, numerous highways deemed to no longer be of significance to the provincial network were decommissioned and responsibility for the routes transferred to a lower level of government, a process referred to as downloading. Portions of Highway4 were transferred to the counties of Elgin, Huron, Bruce and Grey on January1, 1998.

The former portion of Highway 4 south of St. Thomas is now signed as Elgin County Road 4. The former northern portion is broken into several different roads:
 Huron County Road 4 from Clinton to near Wingham
 Bruce County Road 4 (London Road) from near Wingham to Riversdale
 A former concurrency with Highway9 between Riversdale and Walkerton
 Grey County Road 4 from Walkerton to Simcoe County Road 124 just south of Singhampton

In 2017, the City of London announced that Highway 4 through London would be re-signed and re-routed via Richmond Street, Sunningdale Road, and Wonderland Road, resulting in a short concurrency with Highway 401 between the Colonel Talbot Road and Wonderland Road interchanges.

Major intersections

References

004
Roads in London, Ontario
Transport in St. Thomas, Ontario